Schmiede Hallein is a media and art festival taking place since 2003 during September in Hallein, Austria. During a period of ten days international participants work on projects in a former industrial building. It focuses on music productions, film, photography and performances.

Participation 
Schmiede receives over 200 applications from more than 20 countries every year, of which 80% are accepted and an additional 30 guests are invited. The participants are called Smiths and form a community beyond the festival. Participation has been free of charge in earlier years but in 2010 a  €50  participation fee was introduced.

Location 
Schmiede Hallein takes place in a former salt refinery, a building that also hosts other cultural events in Hallein and the Salzburg Summeracadamy. The somewhat isolated location allows participants to focus on their projects without distraction.

Sponsorship 
The festival is supported by a range of companies and institutions ranging from the city of Hallein to federal ministries:
Kulturland Salzburg, city of Hallein, BM:UKK, WIBERG, FM4, Red Bull Music Academy, Kunstraum Pro Arte in Hallein, Carhartt Europe, MusicImport: CAD, Mackie und Aphex, Tourismusverband Hallein

External links 
 Schmiede festival website
 Photo impressions from recent and past years.
 German ARD television report about Schmiede 2011.

References 

Festivals in Austria
New media art
Cultural organisations based in Austria
Hallein